James Percivell Hardy (December 1, 1956 – December 29, 2020) was an American professional basketball player. Hardy played the forward position in the National Basketball Association (NBA) from 1978 to 1982. He played collegiately at the University of San Francisco. At 6'9" (206 cm) and 220 lb (100 kg), he played as a power forward.

NBA career
Hardy was selected with the 11th overall pick in the 1978 NBA draft by the New Orleans Jazz. In four seasons with the Jazz (who relocated to Salt Lake City, Utah in 1979), he averaged 5.7 points, 5.3 rebounds, and 1.3 assists per game.

Death
Hardy died of a heart attack of December 29, 2020 in Long Beach, California.

External links
NBA stats @ basketballreference.com

References

1956 births
2020 deaths
African-American basketball players
American expatriate basketball people in France
American expatriate basketball people in Italy
American expatriate basketball people in the Philippines
American expatriate basketball people in Spain
American men's basketball players
Anchorage Northern Knights players
Basketball players from Alabama
Centers (basketball)
Club Ourense Baloncesto players
Crispa Redmanizers players
Liga ACB players
New Orleans Jazz draft picks
New Orleans Jazz players
Parade High School All-Americans (boys' basketball)
Paris Racing Basket players
People from Knoxville, Alabama
Philippine Basketball Association imports
Power forwards (basketball)
San Francisco Dons men's basketball players
Utah Jazz players
20th-century African-American sportspeople
21st-century African-American people